Good Nights and Bad Mornings 2: The Hangover is the sixth mixtape by Mexican-American rapper Snow Tha Product. It was released on October 14, 2013, by her independent record label WOKE Productions. Snow Tha Product enlisted the collaborators such as Tech N9ne, Dizzy Wright, Trae tha Truth, Cyhi the Prynce and Ty Dolla $ign, among others.

Track listing 

Sample credits
"Cali Luv" samples "California Love" performed by 2Pac featuring Dr. Dre and Roger Troutman.
"Don't Judge Me" samples "Creep" performed by TLC.
"Hold You Down" samples "Lord Hold Me in Your Arms" performed by The Crowns of Glory.
"Cash Rules" samples "C.R.E.A.M." performed by Wu-Tang Clan.

References 

Hip hop albums by American artists
2013 albums